STS-56 was a NASA Space Shuttle Discovery mission to perform special experiments. The mission was launched from Kennedy Space Center, Florida, on April 8, 1993.

Crew

Mission highlights 
The primary payload of the flight was the Atmospheric Laboratory for Applications and Science-2 (ATLAS-2), designed to collect data on the relationship between the Sun's energy output and Earth's middle atmosphere and how these factors affect the ozone layer. It included six instruments mounted on a Spacelab pallet in the cargo bay, with the seventh mounted on the wall of the bay in two Get Away Special (GAS) canisters. Atmospheric instruments included the Atmospheric Trace Molecule Spectroscopy (ATMOS) experiment, the Millimeter Wave Atmospheric Sounder (MAS), and the Shuttle Solar Backscatter Ultraviolet (SSBUV/A) spectrometer (on the cargo bay wall). Solar science instruments were the solar spectrometry instrument SOLSPEC, the Solar Ultraviolet Irradiance Monitor (SUSIM), and the Active Cavity Radiometer (ACR) and Solar Constant (SOLCON) experiments.

ATLAS-2 is one element of NASA's Mission to Planet Earth program. All seven ATLAS-2 instruments first flew on ATLAS-1 during STS-45, and flew a third time in late 1994 on STS-66.

On April 11, 1993, the crew used the remote manipulator arm (Canadarm) to deploy the Shuttle Point Autonomous Research Tool for Astronomy-201 (SPARTAN-201), a free-flying science instrument platform designed to study velocity and acceleration of the solar wind and observe the sun's corona. Collected data was stored on tape for playback after return to Earth. SPARTAN-201 was retrieved on April 13, 1993.

The crew also made numerous radio contacts to schools around the world using the Shuttle Amateur Radio Experiment (SAREX II), including brief radio contact with the Russian Mir space station, the first such contact between Space Shuttle and Mir using amateur radio equipment. It was arguably the first time that the astronauts received amateur television video from the ham radio club station (W5RRR) at JSC.

Other cargo bay payloads were the Solar Ultraviolet Experiment (SUVE), sponsored by Colorado Space Grant Consortium and located in a GetAway Special canister on the cargo bay wall.

The middeck payloads were the Commercial Materials Dispersion Apparatus Instrumentation Technology Associates Experiment (CMIX), the Physiological and Anatomical Rodent Experiment (PARE), Space Tissue Loss (STL-1) experiment, the Cosmic Ray Effects and Activation Monitor (CREAM) experiment. the Hand-held, Earth-oriented, Real-time, Cooperative, User-friendly, Location-targeting and Environmental System (HERCULES), Radiation Monitoring Equipment (RME III), and an Air Force Maui Optical Site (AMOS) calibration test.

Gallery

See also 

 List of human spaceflights
 List of Space Shuttle missions
 Nikon NASA F4
 Outline of space science
 Space Shuttle

References

External links 
 NASA mission summary 
 STS-56 Video Highlights 

Space Shuttle missions
Spacecraft launched in 1993